Lewisham is a suburb in the Inner West of Sydney, in the state of New South Wales, Australia. Lewisham is located 7 kilometres south-west of the Sydney central business district, in the local government area of Inner West Council. The postcode is 2049. Lewisham is surrounded by the suburbs of Petersham, Dulwich Hill, Summer Hill, Haberfield and Leichhardt.

History
Lewisham took its name in 1834 from the estate of Joshua Frey Josephson, a German-born businessman who would later become mayor of Sydney. The estate was named after the London borough of Lewisham, which means Leofsa's village or manor.

The original residents of the Lewisham area were the Cadigal clan of the Darug tribe. Artefacts found near the Cooks River indicate at least 7,000 years of habitation in the local area. When the First Fleet arrived in 1788, the settlers set up camp in the middle of Cadigal territory. While the first governor Arthur Phillip tried to establish cordial relations with the Cadigals and their neighbours, the two groups were competing for the same food sources and tensions inevitably developed. In 1789, a smallpox epidemic wiped out the majority of the Cadigals. By 1809, all the land within Lewisham had been granted.

Heritage listings 
Lewisham has a number of heritage-listed sites, including:
 Great Southern and Western railway: Long Cove Creek railway viaducts, Lewisham
 The Boulevarde: Lewisham Sewer Vent
 over Long Cove Creek: Lewisham Sewage Aqueduct

Transport

Lewisham railway station is on the Inner West & Leppington Line of the Sydney Trains network. This provides access to the city, the interchange station of Strathfield and the commercial centres of Burwood, Newtown and Parramatta.

Lewisham is notable in railway history as the termination point for the first train journey in the NSW colony in 1855, although the railway station was not built until 1885. The whipple truss bridge over Long Cove Creek was constructed 1885-1886 featuring North American technology developed by Squire Whipple. It is probably the most significant railway bridge site in Australia, certainly in NSW. It has the unique distinction of four different types of bridges from different eras. Engineers Australia designated the Viaduct in 1994 as an historic engineering marker.

There are two stations serving Lewisham on the Inner West Light Rail. These are Lewisham West, adjacent to the former flour mill on the border with Summer Hill, and Taverners Hill, near Parramatta Road. Access to the city is quicker by conventional train, but the light rail may be used for some cross-regional journeys. It also interchanges with Dulwich Hill railway station on the Bankstown Line.

The 413 bus service, between Campsie and the city, cuts through the middle of Lewisham and provides an interchange with the railway station. Several bus services (461 - Burwood to the city, 480 & 483 - Strathfield to the city) run along Parramatta Road. These interchange with the Taverners Hill stop. The other bus corridor is along New Canterbury Rd. This is served by the 428/L28 from Canterbury to the city via Newtown and route 445 from Campsie to Balmain.

Schools
A Trinity Grammar School Infants School was opened in February 2006 at 5 Thomas Street, Lewisham. The site was formerly Saint Thomas Becket Primary School which was founded in 1855 by the Sisters of Mercy. The school was originally for girls but became co-ed in the 1950s. Christian Brothers' High School is located on 58 - 61 The Boulevarde. Lewisham Public School is located on 71 The Boulevarde Lewisham. Petersham Public School is on the border of Lewisham and Petersham, the John Berne School (formerly the Berne Education Centre) and the Catholic Intensive English Centre are located on the site of the former St Thomas Boys High School, which closed in 1997.

Churches

Saint Thomas Becket's Catholic church is located in Thomas Street. The current priest is Fr. Gerald Gleeson. The Servants of Mary Help of Christians operated its Marian Centre from St Thomas Becket Primary School Hall. It is now at 2 Missenden Rd CAMPERDOWN NSW 2049, operating from St. Joseph's church.

Lewisham is also the home of the Maternal Heart of Mary Latin Mass Parish, a Personal Parish for the celebration of the Extraordinary Form of the Roman Rite, of which Fr Duncan Wong FSSP is the Parish Priest. The church is situated behind St Thomas Becket's, on Charles O'Neill Way.

Population

Demographics

The character of its population was different from neighbouring suburbs, by having a smaller proportion of residents born overseas. After Australia, the most common countries of birth were England (4.0%), New Zealand (2.5%) and Portugal (1.8%). There were also a reasonable number of Greek (3.2%), and Portuguese (2.3%) speakers, who were the most common languages in the area after English. Indigenous Australians numbered 32 people (1.1%) which was less than the state and national figures.

The population had a greater proportion of people in de facto relationships and a smaller proportion of people in registered marriages than the New South Wales and Australian figures. It had a greater proportion of people stating that they had no religion (33.4%) but fewer Anglicans (9.5%) than the state and national figures, while the proportion of Roman Catholics (25.9%) was lower than New South Wales (27.5%) but slightly higher than the national figures (25.3%).

Notable residents
 Clive Caldwell (1910–1994), World War II air ace
 Les Haylen (1898–1977), author and politician, he was the local federal member of parliament from 1943-1963.
 John Shand (1897–1959), prominent Sydney barrister from the 1920s to the 1950s who took on a number of very high-profile cases of the day.
 Mother Xavier (1870–1938) who was head of the Little Company of Mary (1899–1929) which ran Lewisham Hospital and helped make it one of the top hospitals in Sydney.
 Patrick Joseph Hartigan, Australian bush poet, who wrote under the pseudonym "John O'Grady".
 Percy Hordern (1864–1926), a member of the New South Wales Legislative Council died in Lewisham.

References

External links
  [CC-By-SA]
Inner West Council - History of Suburbs.

 
Suburbs of Sydney
Inner West